Folklore is a 2007 action role-playing video game developed by Game Republic and published by Sony Computer Entertainment. The game is set in Ireland and the Celtic Otherworld of Irish mythology, centering on a young woman named Ellen, and a journalist named Keats, both playable characters who together unravel the mystery that the quaint village of Doolin hides, the mystery that can only be solved by seeking the memories of the dead in the dangerous, Folk-ridden Netherworld.

Gameplay

Folklore is an action role-playing game, where players control characters in a third-person view to both explore their surroundings and engage in combat. From the start, players have a choice to play the game as either of the two lead protagonists, the young woman Ellen or the journalist Keats, both having different yet intertwining plots and play styles. The game is split into two worlds, the real world set in the small sea-side Irish village of Doolin and the more fantastical Netherworld inhabited by folk creatures and spirits.

In Doolin, players lead their chosen character throughout the village and surrounding area. When in this state, characters are unable to engage in combat or utilize their abilities and instead will be limited to exploring the village's locations and interacting with its inhabitants, containing multiple search and slight puzzle-esque quests that progress the main story and eventually lead them to and from the Netherworld, acting as a hub between worlds and subsequent quests.

When characters pass into the Netherworld, the gameplay shifts entirely towards the action-adventure side of its genre. Basic attack techniques are performed by utilizing "folk", various creatures and spirits that upon defeat can be absorbed for the player's use. When a folk is nearly defeated, its spirit will glow red, allowing players to absorb it by locking onto it and performing shaking and yanking motions with the Sixaxis motion control (rather than a conventional button interface) to reel in its energy for use. While the player can choose from nearly all folk encountered and absorbed, only four at a time can be mapped to the controller's main four interface/action buttons and used in quick succession for combat with different kinds of folk being better suited for certain situations and techniques such as close-combat, projectile attacks or magic. The two playable characters themselves also differ between play styles. While Ellen uses a variety of folk as basic strategy and favors a defensive stance with the ability to cloak herself with folk powers, Keats uses more straight up brute force attacks with usually all-round stronger folk along with the ability to release built-up energy to become invincible and perform stronger attacks for a period of time.

Plot
The game takes place in the present day. A young university student by the name of Ellen (Lisa Hogg) is lured to the sea-side village of Doolin, in Ireland, led by a letter from her supposedly dead mother, telling her to meet her at the Cliff of Sidhe, Doolin. Meanwhile, Keats (Richard Coyle), a journalist from an occult magazine called Unknown Realms, receives a telephone call from a woman in distress telling him to come to Doolin, and crying about Faerys who would kill her. Though he suspects it is a prank call, he pays a visit to Doolin Village.

When Ellen arrives at the Cliff of Sidhe, she sees a cloaked figure resting at the edge. Thinking it is her mother, she calls out to the figure, but it does not reply. Keats arrives on the scene then, and asks Ellen if she was the one who called him. When she, surprised, says no, he wonders aloud if the figure at the cliff was the one who called him.

A strong gust of wind suddenly blows across the cliff, and when it dies down, the figure has disappeared. Ellen, distraught, runs down to the beach to find the body and bumps into a girl from the village named Suzette. She questions Ellen, but she is so distressed that she faints. Keats arrives and, after questioning Suzette about Ellen, decides that the best thing would be to bring Ellen back into the village.

Suzette brings Ellen to a small hut and Keats to a base on the edge of the village. That night, they are both visited by strange voices who invite them to the village pub, where they meet creatures they had never before thought existed, and are taken to a place that surpasses all imagination: the Netherworld, realm of the dead. Soon Keats and Ellen find themselves in a 17-year-old murder mystery, where the answers seem to only be found in the Netherworld, the land that can only be accessed from one place in the world, Doolin. To solve the crime and reveal Ellen's forgotten past, they each venture to the Netherworld as travelers, where Faerys and Folks alike await them.

Along the way they meet a variety of different characters, like Scarecrow and Belgae, who help out both of them in their quest. Throughout the game, players learn about the chaos the Netherworld was put into by a previous Netherworld traveller. The eventual goal is to reach the core of the Netherworld and "fix" it. The game takes two different perspectives in the story that shows the different views and opinions of many different characters. While traveling in the Netherworld, many mysterious murders start to occur in the village of Doolin after the appearance of "The Hag." The people murdered are the only ones who knew the truth (or part of the truth) of Ellen's past.

Development
Folklore was announced at E3 2006 which was said to be "The next generation of dark fantasy." It was to be developed by Game Republic, under Yoshiki Okamoto, a video game designer who worked on popular games, including Resident Evil. The game was originally titled Monster Kingdom: Unknown Realms, and was intended as a companion piece to Gaia's Monster Kingdom: Jewel Summoner. However, disappointing sales of Jewel Summoner led to the game being retitled Folklore. Gaia however would assist the development of Folklore, contributing monster designs. Numerous creatures appearing in Folklore would later appear in Gaia's PlayStation Portable game Coded Soul: Uketsugareshi Idea the following year, which also featured connectivity with Folklore.

A playable demo was first released on the Japanese PlayStation Network (PSN) on May 30, 2007. The demo features the two playable characters Keats and Ellen, with the ability to choose from either of them. The demo includes a series of short comic-style cutscenes, exploration of a sea-side village and a trek through a series of playable areas where a player is introduced to the gameplay basics (i.e. fighting, how to acquire new Ids, etc.). This demo was all in Japanese aside from the lines in English that both protagonists would occasionally exclaim during combat.

An English-speech demonstration was released on the European PSN on August 22, 2007; as a limited time offering, it was removed from the PlayStation Store on August 31. This demo was released to the North American PSN on August 23, 2007. An English/Traditional Chinese speech version demo was released on the Asian PSN on September 4, 2007. The original Japanese demo was released in English on European and US PlayStation Network Stores.

Soundtrack

The official Folklore soundtrack was released on 3 discs on June 27, 2007, by TEAM Entertainment. The music was composed by Kenji Kawai, Shinji Hosoe, Ayako Saso and Hiroto Saitoh. The song "Nephilim" by Japanese band Abingdon Boys School plays during the end credits.

Reception

Upon release, Folklore received "favorable" reviews according to video game review aggregator Metacritic. In Japan, Famitsu gave it a score of three eights and a nine, for a total of 33 out of 40.

Most of the praise the game received was direct at the art design and a rich fairy tale/mythological setting and style. Ryan Clements of IGN was particularly impressed with the game's style over the actual technical graphics engine, noting that "Folklore'''s sheer visual beauty comes more from the stellar art direction and execution of the artistic design than the amount of processing power it requires,” helped further by the soundtrack described as "poignant and intrinsically atmospheric." This view was further echoed by Gaming Target, summing up with "technically the game looks great, with the realistic style of Doolin, mixed in with the colorful and absurdly Japanese stylings of the Netherworld levels," later including Folklore in their "52 Games We'll Still Be Playing From 2007."

The battle system where players would catch and utilize various "folk" was considered another positive aspect. GameSpy found that "what makes the enormous library of monsters and moves work so well is that each is most useful in a particular situation" and while GameTrailers also praised the feature finding that "switching folk in and out of your arsenal is easy thanks to well-organized menus," it also criticized brief loading times between shifting in and out of the menus that "puts a damper on the game’s flow." Eurogamer on the other hand felt that the basic level design was "pretty standard dungeon crawling," if not "bland" at times. The use of the SIXAXIS motion control to reel in energy from downed folk was considered a better use of the feature compared to past games, with 1UP.com calling it "the most subtle and sensible use of the PS3's motion control yet."

While the narrative was considered a strong point, with GameZone calling it "compelling," the method of telling much of the story in graphic-novel style still cutscenes however received a less than positive response. Kevin VanOrd of GameSpot felt that while "an interesting design choice" is, in the end "weirdly flavorless." Another issue found in this method was the lack of voice-work outside of the full CGI cutscenes with GamesRadar (in-house) finding it to hinder the delivery of the overall story.

Cancelled sequel
The now-defunct Game Republic was planning a PlayStation Portable or download only Move compatible Folklore sequel and had pitched the idea to Sony. The idea was well received by Sony but due to poor sales of the original Folklore'' were not keen to green light the project which failed to pass the internal review board at Sony by a few points.

Notes

References

External links
 Official website 

2007 video games
Action role-playing video games
Video games about the afterlife
Fantasy video games
Dark fantasy video games
Video games about death
Game Republic games
Occult detective fiction
PlayStation 3 games
PlayStation 3-only games
Sony Interactive Entertainment games
Video games based on Celtic mythology
Video games developed in Japan
Video games featuring female protagonists
Video games scored by Kenji Kawai
Video games scored by Shinji Hosoe
Video games set in the 2000s
Video games set in Ireland
Video games using Havok
Single-player video games